The Lone Star Cafe was a cafe and club in New York City at 61 Fifth at the corner of Fifth Avenue and 13th Street, from 1976 to 1989. The Texas-themed cafe opened in February 1976 and became the premier country music venue in New York and booked big names and especially acts from Texas, like Greezy Wheels, George Strait, Asleep at the Wheel and Roy Orbison.
Willie Nelson, Kinky Friedman, Roy Orbison, Delbert McClinton, Freddy Fender, Lonnie Mack, Doug Sahm, Jerry Jeff Walker, Ernest Tubb, and the Lost Gonzo Band were among Texas musicians who frequented the Lone Star Cafe.  Joe Ely and Billy Joe Shaver also appeared at the cafe.  The words from Shaver's 1973 song "Old Five and Dimers Like Me" were displayed on a banner in the front of the cafe: "Too Much Ain't Enough." Other national acts played the cafe, including The Blues Brothers, Clifton Chenier, the blues duo Buddy Guy & Junior Wells, Toots & the Maytalls, Wilson Pickett and James Brown, who recorded a live album there in 1985.

In the 1970s, various Texas political, media and cultural figures in New York would visit the Lone Star Cafe, including Larry L. King, Ann Richards, Tommy Tune, Dan Rather, John Connally, Chet Flippo, Mark White and Linda Ellerbee.

The cafe sported a unique 40-foot sculpture of a giant iguana created by artist Bob "Daddy-O" Wade on top of the building.  Neighboring businesses did not appreciate the sculpture and sought to have it removed. Although a court battle determined that it was art, eventually it was removed. In 1983 with the support of Mayor Ed Koch, the Iguana was restored to the roof at a ceremony with Koch and then-Texas governor Mark White.
The cafe was co-founded by Mort Cooperman and Bill McGivney, two ad executives at Wells Rich Greene Advertising. Bill McGivney left shortly afterwards and was replaced by Bill Dick.  Both Bill Dick and Mort Cooperman appeared in Kinky Friedman's book A Case of the Lone Star.  Bill Dick was depicted as the owner and Mort Cooperman was the nefarious Detective Sergeant Mort Cooperman.

Shows
1980

Chicken Legs, members of Little Feat minus Lowell George who passed in 1979, with member of Catfish Hodge Band

1981

 UNKNOWN, Ernest Tubb and his Texas Troubadours

1982
May 24, The Richard and Linda Thompson Band
1984
April 28, George Strait and the Ace in the Hole Band
1985
July 7, Danny Toan & Central Park West and Jorma Kaukonen
July 8, Burning Spear and One Life
1986
March 21, The Fall 
May 5, Ed Kaecher and The Band with Rick Danko, Levon Helm, and Garth Hudson
December 27, Willy de Ville
1987
UNKNOWN, Jerry Lee Lewis.
1988
January 7, Hot Tuna with Peter Kaukonen and friends

References

1976 establishments in New York City
1989 disestablishments in New York (state)
Coffeehouses and cafés in the United States
Nightclubs in Manhattan
Restaurants established in 1976